John Henry Williams (19 May 1869 – 7 February 1936), also known as Snowden Williams, was a Liverpool-born Welsh Labour Party politician.

Educated in Cardiff, Oxford and at the London Hospital, he graduated with the Licence of the Society of Apothecaries (LSA) in 1902.

He was initially employed as a ship's surgeon for the Booth Shipping Line, before becoming a general practitioner in Burry Port, Carmarthenshire. He was elected to Burry Port Urban District Council, serving as its chairman. He was also a member of Carmarthenshire County Council where he was the chairman of the health committee and of the child welfare committee.

At the 1922 general election, he was elected as Member of Parliament (MP) for Llanelli, and held the seat until he died from pneumonia in 1936.

References

External links 

1870 births
1936 deaths
Welsh Labour Party MPs
UK MPs 1922–1923
UK MPs 1923–1924
UK MPs 1924–1929
UK MPs 1929–1931
UK MPs 1931–1935
UK MPs 1935–1945
Councillors in Wales
People from Carmarthenshire
Members of the Parliament of the United Kingdom for Carmarthenshire constituencies
20th-century Welsh politicians